André Jacque (born October 13, 1980) is an American politician who serves as a Wisconsin State Senator, representing the 1st senatorial district as a Republican since 2019. He previously served four terms in the Wisconsin State Assembly (2011–2019).

Early life and career

Jacque was born in Beaver Dam, Wisconsin on October 13, 1980, and graduated from Green Bay Southwest High School. He earned his bachelor's degree from the University of Wisconsin–Madison in 2003 and received a graduate certificate from the Madison's Robert M. La Follette School of Public Affairs. He worked as a transit planning coordinator, communications director and a grant-writing consultant before beginning his political career.

Jacque is the board chair of both Great Lakes/St. Lawrence River Legislative Caucus Executive Board and Nutrient Management Taskforce and the Small Business Regulatory Review and the state lead for the National Caucus of Environmental Legislators. He serves as a board member for the Wisconsin Council on Domestic Abuse, Wisconsin Housing and Economic Development Authority, Council on Workforce Investment, Family and Childcare Resources of Northeast Wisconsin Board, Green Bay Area Crime Stoppers, Van Handel Memorial Foundation Board for Families of Children with Special Needs, Brown County Tax Payer Association, and the Knights of Columbus.

Jacque was a former board member of the Wisconsin Small Business Environmental Council, Child Abuse and Neglect Prevention Board, Council on Tourism, Golden House Domestic Violence Shelter Community Leadership Council, Wisconsin Association of Municipal and County Assistant Managers, National Association of Local Government Environmental Professionals Grants Management Taskforce, and the Wisconsin Higher Educational Aids Board in 2001, and served from 2001 to 2003.

Political career
In 2010 Jacque was elected to the Wisconsin State Assembly to represent Wisconsin's 2nd Assembly District. He was reelected to the Assembly in 2012 and ran unopposed for reelection in 2014. In 2016 he also faced no major party opposition. Jacque is a member of the Brown County Taxpayers Alliance, Pro-Life Wisconsin, Wisconsin Right to Life and the National Rifle Association. On May 15, 2018 he won the Republican primary election for the vacant seat for the 1st Senate District but was defeated in the June special election by Democrat Caleb Frostman. He later defeated Frostman in November 2018, winning a full four-year term in the Wisconsin State Senate. Jacque was awarded the Green Bay Area Chamber of Commerce's "Future 15" award in 2011 and again in 2018. He was awarded the 2019–'20 Legislator of the Year award by the Wisconsin VFW for his close work with them.

COVID-19 pandemic 

In 2021, in the midst of the COVID-19 pandemic, Jacque was outspoken against vaccine mandates and authored legislation that would bar government officials or business owners from requiring Wisconsinites to be vaccinated against COVID-19 or show proof of vaccination to access services. Jacque also opposed the statewide mask mandate implemented by Gov. Tony Evers and joined legislation to end it. He tested positive for COVID-19 and was hospitalized with pneumonia in August.

On August 17, 2021, it was reported that he was "tired but in good spirits." On August 20, 2021, State Rep. Shae Sortwell stated in a Facebook post that Sen. Andre Jacque: "is in serious need of your prayers. [...] He is in the hospital with Covid induced pneumonia." On August 25, 2021, Jacque was placed on a ventilator, but was listed in stable condition. In addition, Jacque's brother Pierre fired back at Sortwell, stating: "I am praying that you shut the hell up and f*** off." Sortwell, like Jacque, has opposed vaccine mandates and wearing face masks. Pierre Jacque went on to say in his post: "Go get the vaccine. Or at least be honest and let your flock know that the 'choice' they are making is between effective scientifically backed preventative medicine, or choking on a vent ..." On August 30, 2021, Jacque's wife pleaded: "that those individuals who are eligible and able to receive the COVID-19 vaccine please consider placing their trust in the medical professionals who recommend it."

On September 21, 2021, Jacque was transferred from the hospital to a care facility after being on a ventilator for almost a month. It is unclear what type of facility and whether Jacque was vaccinated. His office did not clarify when asked. He returned to work the second week of October 2021 and reported that he was still using a walker but feeling better every day. He started a meeting by thanking everyone who had supported him during his battle with the disease, including medical professionals helping him through his recovery. On November 8, 2021, Jacque returned to the Senate floor, calling himself "very blessed that God's not done with me yet."

Asked on whether his time in the hospital and months-long physical therapy had changed his views on how Wisconsin could handle public health issues, he said he would not comment on COVID-19 but that he did have some "insights" from his months-long stay in hospitals and rehabilitation centers.

References

External links
 
 
 Senator André Jacque at Wisconsin Legislature
 1st Senate District map (2011–2021) at Wisconsin Legislature

Robert M. La Follette School of Public Affairs alumni
Republican Party Wisconsin state senators
1980 births
Living people
21st-century American politicians
People from Beaver Dam, Wisconsin
People from Green Bay, Wisconsin
Republican Party members of the Wisconsin State Assembly